Piyanggang manok, also spelled pyanggang manok, is a Filipino dish consisting of chicken braised in turmeric, onions, lemongrass, ginger, siling haba chilis, garlic, coconut milk, and ground burnt coconut. It originates from the Tausug people of Sulu and Mindanao. It is related to tiyula itum, another Tausug dish which uses burnt coconut. The dish is characteristically black in color. The chicken may also be grilled before adding the marinade. It is a type of ginataan.

See also
Tiyula itum
List of chicken dishes
Tinola
Kulawo

References

Philippine chicken dishes

Foods containing coconut